The  is a subcompact/supermini/B-segment small car manufactured by Mazda since 1996. While sold across four generations in the domestic Japanese market, the Demio nameplate was rarely used outside of Japan, where it was usually called the Mazda2. The Demio nameplate was retired in 2019 as Mazda changed over to "Mazda2" for their home market as well.

The Demio is built on the Mazda D platform and was preceded by two other small cars based on the platform: the Ford Festiva (designed and built by Mazda for Ford and also sold as the Mazda 121) that was introduced in 1986 and the Revue (sold by Mazda's Autozam marque) introduced in 1990. The name "Demio" is derived from Latin meus to show possession, which in many Romance languages has become "mio."

The third generation Demio earned the 2008 World Car of the Year title, while the fourth generation was awarded the 2014–2015 "Japanese Car of the Year".

The first generation Demio was sold as the Ford Festiva Mini Wagon in some markets.

First generation (DW; 1996) 

Introduced in a time full of negative press coverage, the Demio became a surprise hit for Mazda in Japan, and also foreshadowed B-segment minivans such as the Opel Meriva, Fiat Idea and the Renault Modus.

A concept model previewing the DW series, called the Mazda BU-X was shown in 1995.

At its introduction in 1997, it won the Automotive Researchers' and Journalists' Conference Car of the Year award in Japan.

Production of the new Demio started in July 1996 (sold as the 121 outside Japan and Europe) used the DW platform. Ford retailed a version in Japan as the Ford Festiva Mini Wagon. In 1997, the Mazda logo was changed to the current logo. The Demio received a horizontal grille in September 1998 for Japanese market. The Demio received a facelift in December 1999 with a revised exterior, redesigned dashboard, cabin air filtration, retuned automatic transmission, and available DSC. The original Demio was replaced in 2002.

Engines 
 1.3 L B3-ME I4 (1996–1999)
 1.5 L B5-ME I4 (1996–1999)
 1.3 L B3E I4, /  (1999–2002)
 1.5 L B5E I4, /  (2000–2002)

Production 
The original DW model was produced in Mazda's Colombia plant as "Mazda Demio" until the end of 2007 when the DE model replaced it.

Gallery

Second to fourth generation (2002–2019) 

Beginning with the 2002 second generation Demio, export models received "Mazda2" badging. The third generation appeared in early 2007, followed by a fourth generation in September 2014. Mazda continued to call the car Demio in its home market (and some select export markets) until the nameplate was retired in favor of the global moniker in September 2019.

Gallery

References 

Demio
Cars introduced in 1996
2000s cars
2010s cars
Front-wheel-drive vehicles
Subcompact cars
Hatchbacks
Hybrid electric cars
Partial zero-emissions vehicles
Ford B3 platform